Minimum wage in Croatia is regulated by the Minimum Wage Act and is defined as the lowest gross monthly wage for a full-time worker, based on a 40-hour work week. For workers who do not work full time, minimum wage is lower, in proportion to their working hours. Additional compensation for overtime work, night work, and work on Sundays and holidays is not included in the minimum wage. Minimum wage is recalculated once a year and is effective throughout the next calendar year.

As of 1 January 2023, the minimum gross monthly wage in Croatia is €700, which is equivalent to a net amount of €560. Among 21 EU member states that regulate minimum wage, Croatian minimum wage is fifth lowest.

In January 2018, minimum wage was received by 45,245 workers, down from c. 80,000 in 2014.

See also
 List of minimum wages by country
 List of European Union member states by minimum wage

References

Sources
 
 

Economy of Croatia
Croatia
Law of Croatia